Kalghan (also Romanized as Kalghān; also known as Kalqān) is a village in Ujan-e Sharqi Rural District, Tekmeh Dash District, Bostanabad County, East Azerbaijan Province, Iran. At the 2006 census, its population was 352, in 67 families.

References 

Populated places in Bostanabad County